Bawlakhe Township is a township of Bawlakhe District in the eastern part of Kayah State in Myanmar.

The capital town is Bawlakhe.

References

Townships of Kayah State